Lophocarpinia aculeatifolia is a species of flowering plants in the legume family, Fabaceae. It belongs to the subfamily Caesalpinioideae.

References

Caesalpinieae
Monotypic Fabaceae genera